Brian Scott Sullivan (born April 23, 1969) is an American former professional ice hockey right winger who played two games in the National Hockey League with the New Jersey Devils during the 1992–93 season.

Early life 
Sullivan was born in South Windsor, Connecticut. As a youth, he played in the 1980 Quebec International Pee-Wee Hockey Tournament with a minor ice hockey team from Middlesex County, Connecticut.

Sullivan attended Northeastern University and played on the Northeastern Huskies men's ice hockey team. He finished his junior season with 24 goals and 21 assists in only 34 games.

Career 
Sullivan played two games in the National Hockey League with the New Jersey Devils during the 1992–93 season. The rest of his career, which lasted from 1991 to 1999, was spent in the minor leagues.

Career statistics

Regular season and playoffs

References

External links
 

1969 births
Living people
Albany River Rats players
American men's ice hockey right wingers
Grand Rapids Griffins (IHL) players
Houston Aeros (1994–2013) players
Ice hockey players from Connecticut
Kansas City Blades players
New Jersey Devils draft picks
New Jersey Devils players
Northeastern Huskies men's ice hockey players
People from South Windsor, Connecticut
San Antonio Dragons players
San Diego Gulls (IHL) players
SHC Fassa players
Springfield Falcons players
Utica Devils players